This is list of the Netherlands women's association footballers who have played for the Netherlands women's national football team, since the first women's match recognised by FIFA worldwide in 1971 against France.

Players 
Bold names indicate players who are still active and available for the national team.

As of December 2020.

correct as of 31 June 2022
a: + 1 cap in interland not officially recognised.
b: Pauw also coached the national team.
c: member of the squad that won UEFA Women's Euro 2017.
d: Allott played internationally for England as well.

References

Netherlands
 
Association football player non-biographical articles
international footballers